The 1904 Indiana gubernatorial election was held on November 8, 1904 in all 92 counties in the state of Indiana. Frank Hanly was elected governor over his Democratic opponent, John W. Kern.

Nominations
Hanly (former U.S. Representative from Indiana's 9th congressional district) reentered politics in 1904, and won the Republican nomination for governor of Indiana. William L. Taylor, the former Indiana Attorney General from Indianapolis, also sought the Republican nomination but was defeated. Democrats once again nominated John W. Kern (former city solicitor of Indianapolis) for governor.

Campaign
The election was hard-fought by Hanly, who delivered excoriating speeches against the Democratic party which he referred to as "unholy", and "great only its ability to destroy." He called their election campaign "selfish" and said they ran it only so they could "obtain the flesh pot of office."

General election
Hanly was elected Governor of Indiana, defeating John W. Kern by 84,364 votes.

References 

Bibliography

1904 Indiana elections
1904
Indiana